Paul Stanton Sewald (born May 26, 1990) is an American professional baseball pitcher for the Seattle Mariners of Major League Baseball (MLB). He previously played in MLB for the New York Mets. Sewald played college baseball for the San Diego Toreros.

Amateur career
Sewald attended Bishop Gorman High School in Summerlin, Nevada. In 2008, his senior year, he went 7–0 with a 1.57 ERA, earning All-State honors. Undrafted out of high school in the 2008 MLB draft, he enrolled at the University of San Diego and played college baseball for the San Diego Toreros. As a senior in 2012, he pitched to an 8–4 record with a 3.09 ERA in 15 games (14 starts).

Professional career

New York Mets
The New York Mets selected Sewald in the tenth round of the 2012 MLB draft. They gave him a $1,000 signing bonus. After signing, Sewald made his professional debut that same season with the Brooklyn Cyclones of the Class A-Short Season New York-Penn League where he was 0–2 with a 1.88 ERA in 28.2 relief innings pitched. He pitched in the 2013 season with the Savannah Sand Gnats of the Class A South Atlantic League, compiling a 3–2 record and 1.77 ERA in 35 relief appearances.

Sewald began the 2014 season with the St. Lucie Mets of the Class A-Advanced Florida State League and was promoted to the Binghamton Mets of the Class AA Eastern League during the year. In 43 appearances out of the bullpen between two teams, he was 5–1 with a 1.92 ERA. After the regular season, he played in the Arizona Fall League.

In 2015, he spent with Binghamton where he pitched to a 3–0 record and 1.75 ERA in 44 games. During the season, he pitched for the United States national baseball team at the 2015 Pan American Games. Sewald began 2017 with Las Vegas.

In 2016, he spent with the Las Vegas 51s of the Class AAA Pacific Coast League where he was 5–3 with a 3.29 ERA in a career high 65.2 innings pitched.

On April 8, 2017, Mets promoted Sewald to the MLB, as Ty Kelly was designated for assignment. He made his MLB debut the same day against the Miami Marlins at Citi Field and surrendered two runs in a third of an inning. He was optioned back to Las Vegas on April 13 and recalled again on May 1. After his May 1 recall, he spent the remainder of 2017 with the Mets. In 57 relief appearances for New York, he was 0–6 with a 4.55 ERA and a 1.21 WHIP. He was designated for assignment on May 26, 2019. On August 16, the Mets selected Sewald's contract.

On September 24, 2019, Sewald earned his first MLB win, as the winning pitcher in a walk-off win against the Miami Marlins. In 2020, Sewald struggled to a 13.50 ERA over 6.0 innings of work. On December 2, 2020, Sewald was non-tendered by the Mets.

Seattle Mariners
On January 7, 2021, Sewald signed a minor league contract with the Seattle Mariners organization. On May 13, 2021, Sewald was selected to the active roster. Sewald enjoyed a breakout season with the Mariners due in large part to his improved pitch usage. Writing for 710 ESPN Seattle, Brandon Gustafson described him as "a force" and "the biggest surprise star" of Seattle's bullpen. Sewald admitted in an interview with the station that he had exceeded even his own expectations. Sewald had a 10–3 record with an ERA of 3.06 in 62 games and 64.2 innings while striking out 104 batters in 2021.

On January 13, 2023, Sewald agreed to a one-year, $4.1 million contract with the Mariners, avoiding salary arbitration.

Personal life
Sewald's father, Mark, is a former college baseball pitcher who was drafted out of high school by the Boston Red Sox in 1979. Both of Sewald's parents are accountants. He received his bachelor's degree in accounting from the University of San Diego. Sewald's younger brother, Johnny, an outfielder, was selected in the 14th round of the 2015 MLB draft out of Arizona State University by the Houston Astros.

Sewald's wife, Molly, gave birth to their first child, a daughter, in August 2021.

References

External links

San Diego Torreros bio

1990 births
Living people
Baseball players at the 2015 Pan American Games
Baseball players from Nevada
Binghamton Mets players
Bishop Gorman High School alumni
Brooklyn Cyclones players
Las Vegas 51s players
Major League Baseball pitchers
Medalists at the 2015 Pan American Games
Naranjeros de Hermosillo players
American expatriate baseball players in Mexico
New York Mets players
Pan American Games medalists in baseball
Pan American Games silver medalists for the United States
San Diego Toreros baseball players
Savannah Sand Gnats players
Scottsdale Scorpions players
Seattle Mariners players
Sportspeople from Las Vegas
St. Lucie Mets players
Syracuse Mets players
Tacoma Rainiers players
United States national baseball team players